Moya is a Spanish and also Catalan surname. Notable people with the surname include:

Alejandro Moya (born 1969), Cuban filmmaker
Angel Moya Acosta (born 1964), Cuban political activist
Carlos Moyà (born 1976), Spanish tennis player
Edu Moya (born 1981), Spanish footballer
Eidy Moya (born 1974), Venezuelan boxer
Enrique Moya (born 1958), Venezuelan author
Karina Moya (born 1973), Argentine track and field athlete
Héctor Manuel Moya Cessa (born 1966), Mexican scientist
Hidalgo Moya (1920–1994), American architect
Horacio Castellanos Moya (born 1957), Salvadoran author
Frank Moya Pons, Dominican historian
Gabriel Moya (born 1966), Spanish footballer
Isabel Moya (1961-2018), Cuban journalist and professor
Joaquín Moya (born 1932), Spanish Olympic fencer
Jon Moya (born 1983), Spanish footballer
Jose Moya del Pino (1891–1969) a Spanish-born American painter, muralist and educator.
Juan Moya (1806–1874), Tejano army captain who fought in the Texas Revolution
Karina Moya (born 1973), Argentine hammer thrower
Lucas Moya (born 1987), Argentine footballer
Luis Moya (born 1960), Spanish rally co-pilot
Mario Moya Palencia (1933–2006), Mexican politician
Miguel Ángel Moyà (born 1984), Spanish football goalkeeper
Mike Moya, Canadian rock musician
Patrick Moya (born 1955), French artist
Pedro Moya de Contreras (1528–1591), Spanish-born archbishop and Viceroy of Mexico
Pedro de Moya (1610–1660), Spanish painter of the Baroque period
Roberto Moya (born 1965), Cuban discus thrower
Rodolfo Moya (born 1979), Chilean footballer
Sabina Moya (born 1977), Colombian javelin thrower
Salvador Moyà-Solà (born 1955), Spanish anthropologist
Sandra Moya (born 1974), Puerto Rican track and field athlete
Sergej Moya (born 1987), German actor
Víctor Moya (born 1982), Cuban high jumper
Zenaida Moya, mayor of Belize city

References

Spanish-language surnames
Catalan-language surnames